Bankfoot railway station served the village of Bankfoot, Perth and Kinross, Scotland, from 1906 to 1964 on the Bankfoot Light Railway. In 1911, the registered office of the Light Railway was at 27 South Methven Street in Perth.

History 
The station opened on 7 May 1906 by the Bankfoot Railway. It was the northern terminus of a short branch line and was north of  station. Opposite the only platform were goods sidings and a goods shed. The station was closed to passengers on 13 April 1931 and closed to goods traffic on 7 September 1964. The site became a caravan site with the platform surviving; now it is a housing estate.

References

External links 

Disused railway stations in Perth and Kinross
Former Caledonian Railway stations
Railway stations in Great Britain opened in 1906
Railway stations in Great Britain closed in 1931
1906 establishments in Scotland
1931 disestablishments in Scotland
Bankfoot